Gospel Oak is a ward in the London Borough of Camden, in the United Kingdom. The ward has existed since the creation of the borough on 1 April 1965 and was first used in the 1964 elections. The ward was redrawn in May 1978 and May 2002. The ward will again be redrawn for the 2022 election, and parts of the Hampstead Town ward will be transferred to Gospel Oak. In 2018, the ward had an electorate of 8,978. The Boundary Commission projects the electorate to rise to 9,344 in 2025.

It was represented by future MP Tessa Jowell (LAB) from 1974 to 1986, businessman John Mills (LAB) from 1990 to 2006, Camden Council Leader Raj Chada (LAB) from 2002 to 2006 and future MP Chris Philp (CON) from 2006 to 2010.

Election results

Elections in the 2020s

References 

Wards of the London Borough of Camden
1965 establishments in England